The Faculty of Medicine, University of Khartoum (established 1924 as Kitchener School of Medicine), located in Khartoum, Sudan, is the oldest medical school in Sudan. It was opened in 1924 by Sir Lee Stack, Governor-General of Sudan and Sirdar (General) of the Egyptian army, in memory of Herbert Kitchener, the Governor-General of Sudan from 1898 to 1900.

History

Kitchener School of Medicine 

The school was founded with funds raised from the public, mostly from the United Kingdom. Yearly running costs were financed by endowments and by Sudan government subsidies. The initial intake of students in 1924 was seven.

Students transferred from Gordon Memorial College's School of Science to the Kitchener School and studied for six years from 1939 onwards, before taking their final examinations to earn Diploma of Kitchener School of Medicine (DKSM). The school's diploma was recognised by the Royal College of Physicians of London, UK and the Royal College of Surgeons of England, UK. Kitchener School of Medicine joined Khartoum University College in September 1951.

Faculty of Medicine, University of Khartoum 
After independence in 1956, University College became the University of Khartoum, Kitchener School of Medicine became the Faculty of Medicine, University of Khartoum, and students started graduating with an M.B.B.S. degree. In 2012, the annual intake of new students into the Faculty of Medicine was about 350, and there were about 201 full-time staff, plus many part-time staff. The Faculty of Medicine offers both undergraduate and postgraduate studies and has 14 academic departments.

References

External links 
Official webpage

University of Khartoum
Kitchener School of Medicine
Medical schools in Sudan
Educational institutions established in 1924
Education in Khartoum
Universities and colleges in Sudan
1924 establishments in Sudan